Fleiss' kappa (named after Joseph L. Fleiss) is a statistical measure for assessing the reliability of agreement between a fixed number of raters when assigning categorical ratings to a number of items or classifying items. This contrasts with other kappas such as Cohen's kappa, which only work when assessing the agreement between not more than two raters or the intra-rater reliability (for one appraiser versus themself). The measure calculates the degree of agreement in classification over that which would be expected by chance.

Fleiss' kappa can be used with binary or nominal-scale. It can also be applied to Ordinal data (ranked data): the MiniTab online documentation  gives an example. However, this document notes: "When you have ordinal ratings, such as defect severity ratings on a scale of 1–5, Kendall's coefficients, which account for ordering, are usually more appropriate statistics to determine association than kappa alone." Keep in mind however, that Kendall rank coefficients are only appropriate for rank data.

Introduction

Fleiss' kappa is a generalisation of Scott's pi statistic, a statistical measure of inter-rater reliability.  It is also related to Cohen's kappa statistic and Youden's J statistic which may be more appropriate in certain instances.  Whereas Scott's pi and Cohen's kappa work for only two raters, Fleiss' kappa works for any number of raters giving categorical ratings, to a fixed number of items, at the condition that for each item raters are randomly sampled. It can be interpreted as expressing the extent to which the observed amount of agreement among raters exceeds what would be expected if all raters made their ratings completely randomly. It is important to note that whereas Cohen's kappa assumes the same two raters have rated a set of items, Fleiss' kappa specifically allows that although there are a fixed number of raters (e.g., three), different items may be rated by different individuals (Fleiss, 1971, p. 378). That is, Item 1 is rated by Raters A, B, and C; but Item 2 could be rated by Raters D, E, and F. The condition of random sampling among raters makes Fleiss' kappa not suited for cases where all raters rate all patients.

Agreement can be thought of as follows, if a fixed number of people assign numerical ratings to a number of items then the kappa will give a measure for how consistent the ratings are. The kappa, can be defined as,

(1)

The factor  gives the degree of agreement that is attainable above chance, and,  gives the degree of agreement actually achieved above chance. If the raters are in complete agreement then . If there is no agreement among the raters (other than what would be expected by chance) then .

An example of the use of Fleiss' kappa may be the following: Consider several psychiatrists are asked to look at ten patients. For each patient, 14 psychiatrists gives one of possibly five diagnoses. These are compiled into a matrix, and Fleiss' kappa can be computed from this matrix (see example below) to show the degree of agreement between the psychiatrists above the level of agreement expected by chance.

Definition

Let N be the total number of subjects, let n be the number of ratings per subject, and let k be the number of categories into which assignments are made. The subjects are indexed by i = 1, ... N and the categories are indexed by j = 1, ... k. Let nij represent the number of raters who assigned the i-th subject to the j-th category.

First calculate pj, the proportion of all assignments which were to the j-th category:

(2)
 

Now calculate , the extent to which raters agree for the i-th subject (i.e., compute how many rater--rater pairs are in agreement, relative to the number of all possible rater--rater pairs):

(3)

(4)

(5)

Worked example

In the following example, for each of ten "subjects" fourteen raters, sampled from a larger group, assign a total of five categories. The categories are presented in the columns, while the subjects are presented in the rows. Each cell lists the number of raters who assigned the indicated (row) subject to the indicated (column) category.

Data

See table to the right.

N = 10, n = 14, k = 5

Sum of all cells = 140
Sum of Pi = 3.780

Calculations

The value  is the proportion of all assignments (here ) that were made to the th category.  For example, taking the first column,

 

And taking the second row,

Over the whole sheet,

Interpretation

Landis and Koch (1977) gave the following table for interpreting   values for a 2-annotator 2-class example. This table is however by no means universally accepted.  They supplied no evidence to support it, basing it instead on personal opinion. It has been noted that these guidelines may be more harmful than helpful, as the number of categories and subjects will affect the magnitude of the value. For example, the kappa is higher when there are fewer categories.

Tests of Significance 
Statistical packages can calculate a standard score (Z-score) for Cohen's kappa or Fleiss's Kappa, which can be converted into a P-value. However, even when the P value reaches the threshold of statistical significance (typically less than 0.05), it only indicates that the agreement between raters is significantly better than would be expected by chance. The p value does not tell you, by itself, whether the agreement is good enough to have high predictive value.

See also

 Pearson product-moment correlation coefficient
 Matthews correlation coefficient
 Krippendorff's alpha

References
  MiniTab Inc. Kappa statistics for Attribute Agreement Analysis. https://support.minitab.com/en-us/minitab/18/help-and-how-to/quality-and-process-improvement/measurement-system-analysis/how-to/attribute-agreement-analysis/attribute-agreement-analysis/interpret-the-results/all-statistics-and-graphs/kappa-statistics/ Accessed Jan 22 2019.
  Fleiss, J. L. (1971) "Measuring nominal scale agreement among many raters." Psychological Bulletin, Vol. 76, No. 5 pp. 378–382
  Scott, W. (1955). "Reliability of content analysis: The case of nominal scale coding." Public Opinion Quarterly, Vol. 19, No. 3, pp. 321–325.
  Powers, D. M. W. (2011). "Evaluation: From Precision, Recall and F-Measure to ROC, Informedness, Markedness & Correlation". Journal of Machine Learning Technologies 2 (1): 37–63
  Powers, David M. W. (2012). "The Problem with Kappa". Conference of the European Chapter of the Association for Computational Linguistics (EACL2012) Joint ROBUS-UNSUP Workshop.
  Landis, J. R. and Koch, G. G. (1977) "The measurement of observer agreement for categorical data" in Biometrics. Vol. 33, pp. 159–174
  Gwet, K. L. (2014) Handbook of Inter-Rater Reliability (4th Edition), Chapter 6. (Gaithersburg : Advanced Analytics, LLC) . http://www.agreestat.com/book4/9780970806284_chap2.pdf
  Sim, J. and Wright, C. C. (2005) "The Kappa Statistic in Reliability Studies: Use, Interpretation, and Sample Size Requirements" in Physical Therapy. Vol. 85, No. 3, pp. 257–268
  Hallgren, Kevin A. (2012) “Computing Inter-Rater Reliability for Observational Data: An Overview and Tutorial” in Tutorials in quantitative methods for psychology, Vol. 8, No. 1 pp 23–34.

Further reading

 Fleiss, J. L. and Cohen, J. (1973) "The equivalence of weighted kappa and the intraclass correlation coefficient as measures of reliability" in Educational and Psychological Measurement, Vol. 33 pp. 613–619
 Fleiss, J. L. (1981) Statistical methods for rates and proportions. 2nd ed. (New York: John Wiley) pp. 38–46
 Gwet, K. L. (2008) "Computing inter-rater reliability and its variance in the presence of high agreement ", British Journal of Mathematical and Statistical Psychology, Vol. 61, pp29–48

External links
AgreeStat 360: cloud-based inter-rater reliability analysis, Cohen's kappa, Gwet's AC1/AC2, Krippendorff's alpha, Brennan-Prediger, Fleiss generalized kappa, intraclass correlation coefficients
 Kappa: Pros and Cons contains a good bibliography of articles about the coefficient.
 Online Kappa Calculator  calculates a variation of Fleiss' kappa. 

Categorical variable interactions
Inter-rater reliability
Summary statistics for contingency tables

de:Cohens Kappa#Fleiss' Kappa